The 1980 Buffalo State Bengals football team represented Buffalo State College. They were led by first-year head coach Les Dugan and played their home games at Coyer Field.

Schedule

References

Buffalo State
Buffalo State Bengals football seasons
Buffalo State Bengals football